Wayne Black and Kevin Ullyett were the defending champions but only Black competed that year with Mark Philippoussis.

Black and Philippoussis lost in the quarterfinals to Davide Sanguinetti and Jim Thomas.

Hyung-Taik Lee and Vladimir Voltchkov won in the final 7–5, 4–6, 6–3 against Paul Goldstein and Robert Kendrick.

Seeds
Champion seeds are indicated in bold text while text in italics indicates the round in which those seeds were eliminated.

 Bob Bryan /  Mike Bryan (first round)
 Chris Haggard /  Brian MacPhie (first round)
 Jan-Michael Gambill /  Graydon Oliver (semifinals)
 Mark Merklein /  Thomas Shimada (first round)

Draw

External links
 2003 Siebel Open Doubles draw

SAP Open
2003 ATP Tour